The Ford CD6 platform is an automobile platform made by Ford Motor Company since 2019.

Vehicles
2020-present Ford Explorer (sixth generation)
2020-present Lincoln Aviator (second generation)

References

Ford platforms